George Shorthose (born December 22, 1961) is a former American football wide receiver. He played in three games for the Kansas City Chiefs in 1985.

References

1961 births
Living people
American football wide receivers
Missouri Tigers football players
Kansas City Chiefs players
People from Stanton, California
Players of American football from California
Sportspeople from Jefferson City, Missouri
Sportspeople from Orange County, California
Players of American football from Missouri